

Bulby is a hamlet in the South Kesteven district of Lincolnshire, England, and in the civil parish of Irnham, Bulby and Hawthorpe.

In 1872 the two hamlets of Bulby and Hawthorpe were grouped as Bulby-cum-Hawthorpe forming the eastern side of Irnham parish, being a joint township with a population of 180 in  "of fertile land". About  of Bulby-cum-Hawthorpe land was purchased by Rev. William Watson Smith in about 1840, who built on it the Elizabethan-style Bulby House and grounds. A moated area evident at the time was said to be the site of Bulby Hall which is "supposed to have been burnt down in the Barons' wars".

Bulby has close associations with farming, has a number of surrounding farms, and a plant nursery.

The River East Glen passes close to the west of the hamlet.

There is evidence of a previous Bulby Hall, and two Medieval settlements: Little Bulby and East Bulby.

References

External links 

 Irnham, Bulby and Hawthorpe Parish Homepage
Bulby – aerial view

Hamlets in Lincolnshire
South Kesteven District